The climate of the Nordic countries is that of a region in Northern Europe that consists of Denmark, Finland, Iceland, Norway and Sweden and their associated territories, which include the Faroe Islands, Greenland and Åland.

Seasonal conditions

Winter

The number of hours of sunlight per day does increase during the month of February for Denmark, where they get seven to eight hours a day. Iceland winters are generally mild considering how high its latitude is. In Norway, the coastal regions have mild winters, while further inland winter is much colder. During midwinter, southern areas of Norway only get five to six hours of sunlight a day, while the north gets little to none. Finnish areas north of the Arctic Circle rarely see the sun rise, due to the natural phenomenon of the polar night. In February, Northern Finland sees about four to six hours of daylight a day.

Spring
In Iceland, spring brings warmer and milder temperatures.

Summer
In Iceland, occasionally thunderstorms occur in the south in late summertime, due to warm air being deflected to northern latitudes from warm air masses in other parts of Europe. Also, cold air originating from Canada, warms rapidly over the ocean, forming thunderclouds. Thunderstorms, however, are very rare in Iceland, and there are less than five of them per year. Summer conditions vary in Norway depending on location. The Norwegian coast has cooler summers than areas further inland. Due to its northern location, there is almost no darkness in June and July in the north, reaching as far south as Trondheim. In Finland, summers experience more rainfall than other seasons. Finland areas north of the Arctic Circle rarely see the sun set during the months of June and July, due to the natural phenomenon Midnight sun. During summer in Greenland, ice sheets breaking up trigger what is known as "glacial motion" or "glacial earthquakes".

Global warming

Effects 

Greenland is one of the areas in both the Nordic region and the world most affected by climate change. A July 2006 study completed by "The Journal of Climate", determined that the melting of Greenland's ice sheets was the single largest contributor to global sea level rise. The temperatures from the year 2000 to the present have caused several very large glaciers that had long been stable, to begin to melt away. Three glaciers that have been researched: Jakobshavn Isbræ, Helheim and Kangerdlugssuaq Glaciers, jointly drain more than 16% of the Greenland Ice Sheet. Satellite images and aerial photographs from the 1950s and 1970s show that the front of the glacier had remained in the same place for decades. In 2001, the ice sheet began retreating rapidly, retreating  between 2001 and 2005. Western Greenland's Jakobshavn Isbræ is generally considered the fastest moving glacier in the world, and has been moving continuously at speeds of over  a day with a stable terminus since at least 1950. In the summer of 2005, the island of Uunartoq Qeqertoq was discovered off the eastern central coast of Greenland. Prior to 2005, many people assumed that Uunartoq Qeqertoq was actually a peninsula off Liverpool Land, however, the melting ice shelves revealed that it was only connected to the mainland by glacial ice.

Predicted effects 
Some climate experts have estimated that Greenland could be losing  of ice each year.

The 2008 Environmental Performance Index ranked countries based on the environmental performance of the country's policies. On the list, Norway was ranked 2nd, Sweden was 3rd, 4th was Finland, Iceland was ranked as 11th, and Denmark came in 26th.

See also 

 Climate
 Climate change
 Climate of Denmark
 Climate of Finland
 Climate of Iceland
 Climate of Norway
 Climate of Sweden
 Climate of the Arctic
 Climatology
 Meteorology

References 

Climate of Europe
Nordic countries